The following is a list of notable people educated at Gonville and Caius College at the University of Cambridge, including alumni of Gonville Hall, as the college was known from 1348 to 1351, and notable alumni since. 

Gonville and Caius College alumni include politicians, civil servants, academics, athletes and business leaders, including  14 Nobel Prize winners, the second-most of any Oxbridge college after Trinity College, Cambridge. Seven of these 14 were students at the college: Charles Scott Sherrington (1932, in Medicine), James Chadwick (1935, in Physics), Francis Crick (1962, in Medicine), Antony Hewish (1974, in Physics), Richard Stone (1984, in Economics), J. Michael Kosterlitz (2016, in Physics), and Peter J. Ratcliffe (2019, in Medicine).

The college also has a long-standing association with medical teaching and has educated a number of significant physicians, including John Caius, William Harvey (a pioneer of anatomy), Francis Crick (joint discoverer of the structure of DNA) and Howard Florey (co-discoverer of Penicillin).

Academics

Biologists and chemists
Ed Anderson – chemist
Richard St. Barbe Baker – founder Men of the Trees 
George Thomas Bettany – biologist
Isaac Henry Burkill – botanist
Lawrence Michael Brown – material scientist
Thomas Cavalier-Smith – evolutionary biologist
Philip S. Corbet – entomologist
Robert Percival Cook – biochemist
Ronald Fisher – biologist and statistician
Bernard Kettlewell - entomologist and evolutionist
John William Scott Macfie – entomologist
Stephen Marchant – ornithologist
Dominic Serventy – Australian ornithologist and conservationist
E. Barton Worthington – ecologist and science administrator

Economists
Victoria Bateman – Gonville and Caius economics studies director
Peter Thomas Bauer – Hungarian development economist
Bevan Morris – Maharishi University of Management president
Ivan Png – Singaporean economist
Richard Stone – Nobel Prize-winning economist

Geographers
Ralph Alger Bagnold – explorer and geologist
John Brereton – chronicler of the first European voyage to New England, 1602
Piers Blaikie – geographer
John Frederick Blake – clergyman and geologist
Gordon Manley – climatologist
Josh West (born 1977) – British-American Earth sciences professor
Edward Adrian Wilson – explorer who died with Robert Falcon Scott in the Antarctic

Historians

Tobias Abse – historian
Francis Blomefield – historian of Norfolk
Christopher N. L. Brooke – Dixie Professor of Ecclesiastical History and life fellow of the college 
Rajnarayan Chandavarkar – historian of South Asia
Alfred Cobban – historian of France
Geoffrey Crossick – historian and Vice-Chancellor of London University
I. E. S. Edwards – egyptologist, leading expert on Egyptian pyramids
David Feldman – historian
Orlando Figes – historian
Harold James – historian
Colin Kidd – historian
Simon Sebag Montefiore – historian and journalist
Richard Overy – historian
Andrew Roberts – historian
Norman Stone – historian
Lars Tharp – historian and broadcaster
Stephen Tuck – historian and Pembroke College, Oxford fellow

Law
William Warwick Buckland – scholar of Roman Law, Regius Professor of Civil Law 
Henry Chauncy – scholar of law and antiquarian
Graham J. Zellick – legal scholar and former Vice Chancellor of the University of London

Literature and languages
James Adam – classicist
D. R. Shackleton Bailey – classicist
Robert Lubbock Bensly – orientalist
Edward Valentine Blomfield – classicist
Stanley Arthur Cook – Regius Professor of Hebrew 
Emily Hauser - classicist professor at University of Exeter
William Ridgeway – classicists and Disney Professor of Archaeology
A. C. Spearing – author, professor of English medieval literature

Mathematicians
Alexander Brown – mathematician and educator in South Africa
J. F. Cameron – mathematician, Master and Vice-Chancellor of Cambridge University
Harish-Chandra – mathematician
Eugenia Cheng – mathematician
John Horton Conway – mathematician
Quentin Stafford-Fraser – computer scientist, and inventor of the webcam
Richard D. Gill – mathematician
George Green – mathematician
Chandrashekhar Khare – mathematician
John Venn – logician, inventor of the Venn diagram

Philosophers and Political Scientists
Mantas Adomėnas – Lithuanian philosopher
Tim Bale – political scientist
Michael Joseph Oakeshott – philosopher

Physicists

Thomas Allibone – physicist
Étienne Biéler – Canadian physicist
Homi J. Bhabha – Indian nuclear physicist and father of India's nuclear programme
Max Born – Nobel Prize-winning physicist
Alec Broers – vice-chancellor of Cambridge University
Cecil Reginald Burch – physicist and engineer
Sam Edwards – Welsh physicist
David J. Farrar – aeronautical engineer
Christopher Green – Regius professor of Physics
Basil Schonland – physicist
Alec David Young – aeronautical engineer

Theologians
Henry Ainsworth – nonconformist theologian and scholar
Thomas Allen – nonconformist minister and preacher
Robert Allwood – clergyman in colonial Australia
William Anderson – Bishop of Salisbury
Arthur Rawson Ashwell – theologian
William Ayerst – clergyman and missionary
Thomas Bacon – 15th Master of the college
Thomas Ball – Archdeacon of Chichester
John Ballard – priest and conspirator in the Babington Plot
Joshua Bassett – cleric and Master of Sidney Sussex College
St. Vincent Beechey – clergyman and photographer
George Bland – Archdeacon of Lindisfarne (1844–53) and Archdeacon of Northumberland 
Henry Bousfield – Bishop of Pretoria 
Thomas Braddock – clergyman and translator
F. F. Bruce – biblical scholar
Spencer Carpenter – clergyman and theologian
Benedict Chapman – theologian and Master of the college 
John Clarke – clergyman and natural philosopher
Samuel Clarke – clergyman and philosopher
Charles Coates – cleric and antiquarian
Jeremy Collier – theologian and theatre critic
John Cosin – Bishop of Durham (1660–72) and Master of Peterhouse 
Arthur Crosse – Archdeacon of Furness
Islwyn Davies – clergyman and theologian
G. H. Pember – theologian
Jeremy Taylor – author and cleric

Artists, writers and musicians

Julian Anderson – composer
Charles Frederick Barnwell – curator and antiquarian
Robert Baron – poet
Henry Bell – architect
Edwin Keppel Bennett – poet
Trevor Blakemore – poet
Alain de Botton – popular philosophy writer
Thomas Boyce – dramatist
E. R. Braithwaite – novelist and critic of racial discrimination
Thomas Broughton – clergyman and writer
James Burrough – architect and Master of the college 
Arnold Cooke – composer
William Clubbe – clergyman and poet
Richard Cobbold – writer
John Dighton – playwright and screenwriter
Charles Montagu Doughty – poet and explorer, author of Travels in Arabia Deserta
Tim Hunkin – artist, inventor, author, cartoonist, engineer
Geoff Nicholson – novelist
Thomas Shadwell – playwright, Poet Laureate
Joseph Thurston – poet
William Wilkins – architect

Athletes
Harold Abrahams – 100 metre Olympic gold medalist portrayed by actor Ben Cross in Chariots of Fire
Gerry Alexander – cricketer
Basil Allen – cricketer
Frederick Arnold – rower and clergyman
Randolph Aston – rugby player
Harold Bache – cricketer
Andrew Baddeley – middle-distance runner
Edward Baily – cricketer
John Bateman-Champain – cricketer
Iftikhar Bokhari – former Pakistani cricketer who played first-class cricket, 1952–1966
Charles Brune – cricketer
Ernest Brutton – rugby player and cricketer
William Cave – rugby player
Arthur Ceely – cricketer
Alexander Cowie – cricketer and poet
Thomas Selby Egan – first cox to win The Boat Race for Cambridge University
Richard Geaves – international footballer
John Grimshaw – creator of the National Cycle Network and the Sustrans charity
Ronald Cove-Smith – England rugby team captain 
 Michael Taylor – cricketer, historian, and member of the 2015 University Challenge championship team
William Yatman – rower and artist
Arthur Young – rugby player

Business

John Arbuthnott – businessman and peer
Charles Barlow – businessman and philanthropist
Nigel Howard Croft – chairman of the ISO/TC 176
Thomas Gresham – founder of the Royal Exchange
Anthony Habgood – chairman of Reed Elsevier and Whitbread
Douglas Myers – businessman and philanthropist
Dorabji Tata – Indian industrialist and philanthropist
Adair Turner – businessman

Civil servants
Edward Alderson – judge
Jerome Alexander – High Court judge in Ireland 
Richard Baggallay – Conservative politician and judge of the Court of Appeal
Nigel Baker – diplomat and former British ambassador to Bolivia and the Holy See
Henry Bedingfield – judge
Thomas Bedingfield – judge
Anton Bertram – barrister and Chief Justice of Ceylon 
Henry Bickersteth – law reformer
John Lindow Calderwood – lawyer and politician
Alan Campbell – diplomat, former ambassador to Ethiopia and to Italy 
George William Chad – diplomat
Alan Charlton – diplomat and former British ambassador to Brazil 
Christopher Clarke – Court of Appeal of England and Wales 
Robin Cooke – New Zealand's only judge to have sat in the House of Lords
Samuel Cooke – judge
Geoffrey Allan Crossley – former ambassador to Colombia and the Holy See 
Duncan Cumming – colonial administrator
Alun Talfan Davies – Welsh judge
Patrick Dean – British Ambassador to the United States 
George French – Chief Justice of Sierra Leone and the British Supreme Court for China and Japan
John Hookham Frere – diplomat and author
Peter Goldsmith – Attorney General of England and Wales
Charles Kennedy – diplomat
Dame Emily Lawson – head of the NHS COVID-19 vaccine programme
John F. Lehman – American Secretary of the Navy and 9/11 Commission member
Lester Paul Wright – Under Secretary at Department for Culture, Media and Sport 
Inagaki Manjirō – Japan's first Minister Resident in Siam 
Percy Wyn-Harris – colonial administrator and Governor of the Gambia

Film and television
Simon Russell Beale – actor, author, and music historian
Jimmy Carr – comedian and presenter of The Big Fat Quiz of the Year
Mark Wing-Davey – actor and director
Anatole de Grunwald – Russian British film producer and screenwriter
Stephen Mangan – actor
Holly Walsh – comedian
Sophie Watts – film and media executive

Heads of state
Percy Wyn-Harris – mountaineer, adventurer, and Governor of The Gambia

Media and journalism

Alistair Appleton – TV presenter
Charles Beavan – law reporter
Helen Castor – historian and BBC Radio 4 broadcaster
Thomas Chenery – editor of The Times 
Mark Damazer – BBC Radio 4 and BBC Radio 4 Extra controller and Master of St Peter's College, Oxford
Jonathan Davis – Financial Times and The Independent columnist
David Elstein – media executive, founder of Channel 5 television
Carolyn Fairbairn – media executive
David Frost – broadcaster
Tim Gardam – journalist and educator
Andrew Gowers – journalist
Christopher Helm – publisher
Gideon Rachman – journalist
Mick Rock – photographer

Military
Harold Ackroyd – Victoria Cross recipient for his actions in the Battle of Passchendaele
Geoffrey Appleyard – British Army officer
Peter Churchill – Special Operations Executive (SOE) officer in France during the Second World War
Brian de Courcy-Ireland – naval officer
Henry St John Fancourt – naval aviator
Richard Tomlinson – former British MI6 officer

Physicians

George Francis Abercrombie – physician and co-founder of the College of General Practitioners
John Carr Badeley – physician
Andrew Balfour – medical writer and novelist
Andrew Whyte Barclay – physician
George Burrows – physician and President of the Royal College of Physicians
Henry Burton – physician and chemist, discoverer of Burton's line
William Butts – King Henry VIII's physician
John Caius – physician and second founder of the college 
Walter Butler Cheadle – paediatrician
John Brian Christopherson – physician and a pioneer of chemotherapy
Cyril Clarke – physician, geneticist and lepidopterist
Rodney Cove-Smith – physician and rugby player
Maurice Craig – psychiatrist
Martin Davy – physician, academic and master of the college 
Arthur Farre – obstetric physician
Harold Gillies – "the father of plastic surgery"
William Harvey – medical pioneer
Bill Inman – pharmacovigilance pioneer
Bernard Kettlewell - doctor, geneticist, evolutionist
Basil Mackenzie – physician
Walter Myers – physician and parasitologist
Howard Somervell – surgeon, mountaineer, and missionary

Politicians

Jack Ashley – Labour politician and peer
Ernest Baggallay – Conservative politician
Esmond Birnie – Ulster Unionist Party politician and former member of the Northern Ireland Assembly
Paul Bryan – Conservative politician
Alastair Campbell – Labour politician and aide to Tony Blair
Robert Carr – Conservative MP and Home Secretary 
Kenneth Clarke – Conservative MP, Father of the House, former Lord Chancellor and Secretary of State for Justice and former Chancellor of the Exchequer
Bob Clay – Labour politician
Rice Richard Clayton – Conservative politician
Chris Davies – Liberal Democrat MEP
Quentin Davies – Labour politician and former MP for Grantham and Stamford (1987–2010)
Peter Fraser – Scottish Conservative politician
Donald Johnson - Conservative MP, general practitioner, author
Elwyn Jones – Labour politician, Lord Chancellor 
Thomas Lynch Jr. – American Founding Father who signed United States Declaration of Independence
Iain Macleod – Conservative MP and former Chancellor of the Exchequer
Keith Vaz – Labour politician
Vivian Wineman – President of the Board of Deputies of British Jews

Royalty
Lady Nicholas Windsor (Paola Doimi de Frankopan) – Croatian aristocrat and wife of Lord Nicholas Windsor

Other
Lawrence Beesley – survivor of the Titanic
Michael Kidson – schoolmaster at Eton College
Titus Oates – Popish plotter

References

Alumni of Gonville and Caius College, Cambridge
Gonville